PM2 may refer to:

Parallel Multithreaded Machine, a software for parallel networking of computers
PM2 (software), a software for Node.js process management
Power management 2 mode, a SATA hard disk configuration which prevents automatic spinup when power is applied
 PM² (PM squared), a project management methodology developed by the European Commission
Paper Mario 2, a 2004 GameCube game